For the British saxophone player, see Alan Wakeman

Alan Wakeman (1936-2015) was a British author, playwright, vegan and gay rights activist.

Biography
He was born in London and grew up in Coulsdon, Surrey. He attended Purley Grammar School and later did National Service in Singapore and Sri Lanka (then Ceylon). He worked as an architect before spending three years in France, after which he returned to Britain to work as a teacher of English as a foreign languages. Between 1967 and  wrote an English language course called English Fast, which sold steadily for several decades. From the 1970s onward, he became a staunch member of the Gay Liberation Front. He wrote the first GLF song, A Gay Song (which was played at his funeral service) and was a founding member of the theatre troupe Gay Sweatshop in 1974. For nearly fifty years, he lived in Soho, London and became a dedicated campaigner against development of historical sites.

Wakeman was a vegan from the 1970s and co-authored an early vegan cookbook with Gordon Baskerville in 1986.

Doctor Who
In 1963, Wakeman was commissioned to write a serial for the  first season of Doctor Who, which was then still in development. He produced a four-part story called The Living World, though this was seemed too sophisticated for the intended audience, and was never proceeded with, and exists only as a script for one episode. When the series was revived in 2005, Wakeman offered the unmade story to the series a second time, though it was not produced on this occasion either. The script was eventually published in the magazine Nothing at the End of the Lane in 2012.

Death

Wakeman died in August 2015, aged 79 after suffering for many years from diabetes. His funeral was held at St Anne's Church, Soho. He died soon after the publication of his autobiography Fragments of Joy and Sorrow.

Partial bibliography

References

1936 births
2015 deaths
20th-century British dramatists and playwrights
Gay Liberation Front members
Vegan cookbook writers
British veganism activists
Burials at St Anne's Church, Soho